Sphinx Glacier is in the Wind River Range, Bridger-Teton National Forest, in the U.S. state of Wyoming. The glacier is situated on the southern slope of Mount Woodrow Wilson and immediately west of the Continental Divide. The glacier is flanked on the east by a mountain known as The Sphinx. Sphinx Glacier is on the opposite side of the Continental Divide from Dinwoody Glacier.

See also
 List of glaciers in the United States

References

Glaciers of Sublette County, Wyoming
Glaciers of Wyoming